Hunted: The Demon's Forge is an action role playing game set in a dark fantasy world. The game was developed by inXile Entertainment and published by Bethesda Softworks for PlayStation 3, Xbox 360 and Microsoft Windows.

Gameplay

The game features co-operative multiplayer with online, splitscreen, and LAN options. E'lara is able to use a bow and small weapons, while Caddoc wields larger melee weapons, as well as a crossbow. Players have the option to explore large areas; however, the gameplay is mostly linear with many points of no return. Players are able to use spells to help in combat.

The game supports cross-regional co-operative play on all platforms, but the random match-making feature is regional on PC and PlayStation 3, and cross-regional on Xbox 360.

Plot

Two mercenaries in battle, E'lara and Caddoc, go searching for a mysterious artifact about which Caddoc had a vision, but events grow out of hand and the companions become wrapped up in a chain of events involving demons, the orc-like Wargar, and a sorceress named Seraphine.

Development
Hunted: The Demon's Forge shares a similar title and fantasy setting with Brian Fargo's first widely distributed game, his self-published 1981 graphical text adventure The Demon's Forge.

inXile Entertainment's President Matt Findley said that Hunted: The Demon's Forge'''s game mechanics are mainly based on his team's own experience playing co-op games and the resulting stream of ideas on how to improve the genre step-by-step. Findley's personal criticism towards similar co-op titles is that the general definition of co-op has sunk "to allowing two players to play together". "We're co-op in that all of our special skills and abilities are designed to make you work together," Findley added later in the interview.

Before the game's release, Findley stated that a sequel and continuing series would happen if the first game saw enough commercial success. Many ideas were not used, and they would improve the co-op mode in sequels. The next installment would not necessarily be a sequel, but possibly a prequel or new story set in the same world with different characters.

ReceptionHunted: The Demon's Forge received "mixed" reviews on all platforms according to video game review aggregator Metacritic. In Japan, where the PlayStation 3 and Xbox 360 versions were ported for release on 25 August 2011, Famitsu gave both console versions each a score of two sevens, one eight, and one seven for a total of 29 out of 40.The Escapist gave the Xbox 360 version three stars out of five and said, "Good for a quick and fun diversion, Hunted is far from the perfect coop game or fantasy dungeon crawl, but the storytelling almost makes up for it. Almost." Digital Spy gave the same version three stars out of five, stating that "the muddy graphics and frequently questionable design choices make the campaign sometimes feel like a chore." The Daily Telegraph gave said version a similar score of six out of ten and said it was "a decent enough game to play through, but certainly one you'll forget in a hurry. It's the kind of game perfect for a lull in gaming when there's nothing else left, and you fancy something disposable but enjoyable." Edge gave the console version six out of ten and said, "Like a horse swishing its tail with futile persistence, Hunted never manages to rid itself of bugs." However, The A.V. Club gave the same version a C and stated that the problem with the game is that "It thinks ham-fisted cooperation is indistinguishable from effortless cooperation. Any two people playing together know better." GameZone gave the game a score of five out of ten and said that it "offers a modicum of playing pleasure on a slow weekend, but a rental would be safer than a purchase." Metro gave the same console version four out of ten and said, "Gears of War meets Diablo'' turns out not to be a classic pairing after all, or at least not when it comes to this low rent hotchpotch of other people's ideas."

References

External links

2011 video games
Action video games
Bethesda Softworks games
Cooperative video games
Dark fantasy video games
Games for Windows certified games
InXile Entertainment games
PlayStation 3 games
Unreal Engine games
Video games developed in the United States
Video games featuring female protagonists
Windows games
Xbox 360 games
Multiplayer and single-player video games